New England 200 may refer to:

 Lakes Region 200, a NASCAR Nationwide Series race held at New Hampshire Motor Speedway
 UNOH 175, a NASCAR Camping World Truck Series race held at New Hampshire Motor Speedway from 2001-2002
 New Hampshire Indy 225, an Indycar Series race held at New Hampshire Motor Speedway